Cathlamet may refer to:

The Kathlamet, a Native American tribe of Oregon and Washington
Cathlamet, Washington, a city in Washington
The MV Cathlamet, a ferry vessel operated by Washington State Ferries